The SEAT Ibiza is a supermini car that has been manufactured by Spanish car manufacturer SEAT since 1984. It is SEAT's best-selling car. The Ibiza is named after the Spanish island of Ibiza and was the second SEAT model to be named after a Spanish location, after the SEAT Málaga. It was introduced at the 1984 Paris Motor Show as the first car developed by SEAT as an independent company, although it was designed by SEAT in collaboration with well-known firms including Italdesign, Karmann, and Porsche.

From the second-generation version onwards, SEAT formed part of the German automotive industry concern Volkswagen Group. All subsequent Ibiza generations, and the rest of the SEAT model range, incorporated Volkswagen Group platforms, parts, and technologies.

The Ibiza spans five generations, among which it has debuted twice (in its second and in its fourth generations) a new platform of the Volkswagen Group. All of them were the top-selling model in SEAT's product line.

The Ibiza is now available only in five-door hatchback variants; between 1993 and 2008, saloon, coupé, and estate versions were sold as the SEAT Córdoba. In 2010, an estate version, called Ibiza ST, was launched.

First generation (021A; 1984)

Introduced at the 1984 Paris Motor Show, the SEAT Ibiza Mk1 (codenamed 021A) entered production on the 'Zona Franca' assembly lines on 27 April 1984 and proved to be a success for the Spanish manufacturer, as it sold 1,342,001 units prior to the launch of the second-generation Ibiza in 1993. The Ibiza's sales success gave the SEAT marque a platform to build on, as it looked to increase sales in following years.

This version, while it established the now classic Ibiza shape, was advertised as having "Italian styling and German engines": its bodywork was designed by Giorgetto Giugiaro's Italdesign, and it was prepared for industrialisation by the German manufacturer Karmann. It was based on the SEAT Ronda, a small family car, which in turn was based on the Fiat Ritmo. The gearbox and powertrain were developed in collaboration with Porsche, thus named under licence System Porsche. Despite Porsche's direct involvement in the Ibiza's engines, it was only after paying a royalty of seven German marks per car sold back to Porsche that SEAT gained the right to put the 'System Porsche' inscription on the engine blocks.

By the time Giugiaro was assigned to the Ibiza project, his previous proposal for the second generation of the Volkswagen Golf had been rejected by Volkswagen. So when SEAT approached him with the proposal for a spacious supermini-class contender, that particular project was reincarnated as the first generation of the SEAT Ibiza.

Using a compact car as a basis, it was larger than most superminis like the Ford Fiesta and Opel Corsa/Vauxhall Nova, but smaller than small family cars such as the Ford Escort and Opel Kadett/Vauxhall Astra. The luggage capacity started from 320 litres, or 1,200 litres after folding rear seats.

It was launched in the United Kingdom market in September 1985, along with the Málaga saloon. It largely competed with budget offerings like the Hyundai Pony, and gave budget buyers a more modern alternative to the outdated offerings from Lada, Škoda, Yugo, and FSO. After a slow start, sales picked up and reached the 10,000-per-year milestone by the end of the decade.

The interior space was good but the styling was fairly unimaginative even though it was known for having a rather quirky interior instrument layout, marked by a lack of control stalks.  The indicators were operated by a rocker-switch, and the headlights by a sliding switch. It had three principal trim levels (L, GL, and GLX) with body styles of 3 and 5 doors and several versions including Base, Special, Disco, Chrono, Designer, Fashion, and SXi. As power outputs dropped due to more stringent emissions requirements, a 1.7-litre version of the engine was developed for the Sportline version. For the same reason, a  turbocharged version of the 1.5-litre engine was developed for the Swiss market and presented in March 1989.

In the meantime, SEAT had already signed a cooperation agreement with Volkswagen (1982), and in 1986, the German car maker became SEAT's major shareholder. The Ibiza Mark 1 received a very light restyling in early 1989 with a moderate exterior face lift, an entirely new, less radical interior, and many mechanical modifications. This is referred to as the second series, although it can be hard to distinguish from the original. Most obvious is the shift from a black plastic grille with seven bars to one with four body-colored ones, with some models receiving new side moldings. The interior was all new, with new seats and a new steering wheel, while the gearbox was thoroughly redesigned, and the brakes and steering improved. At the time, the Ibiza was being produced at a rate of 1,100 cars per day, and the cumulative production had reached a half million.

A more thorough restyling was launched in 1991 under the name New style, although by now an all-new Ibiza was being developed.

The following year, in February 1992, SEAT launched the Ibiza "Serie Olímpica" to celebrate SEAT's participation in the 1992 Olympic Games in Barcelona as a sponsor, and the SEAT Ibiza Mk1 along with the SEAT Toledo Mk1 became the official cars of the Games.

Engine specifications

All engines were inline-four-cylinder units, front transverse mounted: The 0.9-litre and 1.2-litre engines had carburetors, as did the 1.5-litre 85 hp engine, while the 1.5-litre 90 hp and 1.7-litre engines, introduced in 1989, used single-point injection systems. The 1.5-litre 100 hp, introduced in 1988, had multi-point fuel injection. The 1.7-litre diesel was an indirect injection unit.

Motorsport
The SEAT Ibiza Mk1 took part in several rally events and formed the basis on which the Campeonato SEAT Ibiza de Rallies was organised by the SEAT Sport division in 1985, however its most notable rally version has been the all-wheel-drive Ibiza Bimotor, manufactured in 1986 and equipped with two engines, each delivering power to one axle.

Rebadges

In 1997, the Ibiza Mk1 design license was bought by a joint venture between Chinese automaker Nanjing Automobile Group and Malaysia's Lion Group. In June 1999, it entered production as the Eagle, and was redeveloped and rebadged into the Nanjing Yuejin Soyat in the late 2003. Chinese Ibiza production came to a final end in 2008, after another facelift in 2007.

Derivatives
The Spanish company Emelba produced two derivatives of the SEAT Ibiza Mk1: a pickup truck version, and the Emelba Siete, a 7-seat MPV derivative.

In addition to the Emelba variants, further Ibiza Mk1 derivative models have been produced from several companies, including the Anibal Raider and Podadera models.

Concept cars
SEAT has also produced on its own a cabriolet version of the SEAT Ibiza Mk1, Ibiza cabrio, a model which is currently found in its Nave A122 site.

Second generation (6K; 1993)

The Ibiza Mk2 (Typ 6K) was the first Ibiza generation fully developed and produced under Volkswagen Group ownership. Its platform variant was based on the Volkswagen Polo 6N and Volkswagen Golf Mk3. In the interior, the pre-facelift Ibiza 6K shared its dashboard with many other models from SEAT and Volkswagen, such as the SEAT Córdoba Mk1, the Volkswagen Polo Classic, the SEAT Inca, the Volkswagen Polo Mk3, and others.

This Ibiza was available in three- and five-door models; the saloon/coupé variant was known as the SEAT Córdoba, and the estate was known as the SEAT Córdoba Vario. The Ibiza was regularly the best-selling car in Spain and sold relatively well in the rest of Europe, helping SEAT increase its sales figures significantly from 1993 onwards.

Before the facelift, the trim levels were i, CL, CLX, GLX, Pasion, S, and GTI.

1996 revision

The 6K Ibiza had a minor facelift in 1996, which included changing the general aesthetics of the car, by adding smoother bumpers and changing the grille and headlamps and the trim levels offered (Base, E, S, SE, SXE, Sport, GT, GTI, GTI 16V, Cupra, and Sport).

In addition to changes to the appearance of the car, the powertrain and running gear changed with the addition of the  2.0-litre 16v ABF petrol engine, the successor to the 1.8-litre 16v and the 2.0-litre 16v engines previously used in the Volkswagen Golf Mk3.

Engine specifications

1999 facelift

The 1999 Ibiza Mk2 facelift (Typ 6K2, also known as 6K GP01, and sometimes referred to in the UK as the Mk3) was the second Ibiza to be produced under Volkswagen Group management. In addition to a revised front and rear end, new styling cues were added, such as the tailgate-mounted SEAT badge that doubled as a boot release switch when pushed. In the interior, the changes included a newly designed dashboard along with new door panels. The launch of the Cupra models, along with success in rallying, gave it a much stronger, sporty image, which helped align SEAT vis-à-vis the Volkswagen Group's recently acquired budget brand Škoda Auto.

The Ibiza's 1.05-, 1.4-, 1.6-, and 1.8-litre petrol, and 1.9-litre Turbocharged Direct Injection (TDI) and Suction Diesel Injection (SDI) diesel engines were the same as those used in the Volkswagen Polo.  The Ibiza's powertrain and running gear were also used in the SEAT Córdoba saloon, estate, and coupé.

Under Volkswagen's ownership, SEAT was marketed as a sporty and youthful brand whose cars were sold at competitive prices. The available trim levels were Entry, S, SE, SX, Award, Stella, Signo, Sport (1.8T 20V 156 PS), Cupra, and Cupra R.

SEAT later introduced a more powerful hot hatch, dubbed Cupra, equipped with a turbocharged 1.8-litre engine, followed by the Cupra R, of which only 200 units were produced.

By the time production of the second generation Ibiza/Córdoba ceased during 2002, the range had established itself as one of the most popular superminis in Europe of the past decade, having sold 1,522,607 cars from 1993 to 2002.

Engine specifications

Motorsport
SEAT was not involved in the World Rally Championship after the 1977 season, until 1995, when, after an 18-year gap, they returned with an Ibiza 1.8-litre 16v driven by Erwin Weber in the Rally of Portugal, in the two-wheel-drive category. That same year, Weber won first place in the two-wheel-drive category in the Acropolis Rally, with Antonio Rius in second place.  The Copa Ibiza 16V also made its debut that year. The successes of the 1995 season encouraged SEAT to participate the following year in the World Rally Championship in the 2.0-litre engine category, with the SEAT Ibiza Kit Car, a decision which proved to be successful as SEAT won the 1996 FIA 2-Litre World Rally Cup title, becoming the first brand to win the world title in its debut year. SEAT Sport in the next two seasons reaffirmed its domination, winning 2.0-litre WRC championship titles in 1997 and 1998, with drivers Harri Rovanperä, Oriol Gómez, Toni Gardemeister, Jörgen Jonasson, and Gwyndaf Evans.

Safety
In 2000, the SEAT Ibiza Mk2 was tested for its safety performance under the Euro NCAP assessment scheme and it achieved a 3-star overall rating:

Rebadges

The Ibiza was also produced in South Africa, where it was rebadged as the Volkswagen Polo Playa.

Awards
 Car of the year 1994, in Spain
 Carro of the year award in 1994, in Portugal

Third generation (Typ 6L; 2002)

The Ibiza Mk3 (Typ 6L) was the second Ibiza generation to be fully produced under Volkswagen Group ownership. Built on the same PQ24 platform as the Volkswagen Polo Mk4 (Typ 9N), it was styled by the Italian designer Walter de Silva to have a sporty, performance image. The model lineup included two hot hatch variants, the Ibiza FR and Cupra, which compensated for the lack of Polo hot hatch variants (the Polo GTI wasn't launched until 2006).

Its production was initially focused in SEAT's main plant in Martorell, Spain, however in September 2002 a decision was taken by the Volkswagen Group that a part of the production (up to 50,000 units annually) would be transferred to Volkswagen's plant in Bratislava, Slovakia.

Apart from the more aggressive styling, it was larger than the previous two generations, with room for five adults, and a spacious (if rather short) boot. The standard trim level on this model was noticeably higher than previous models. This was regarded by some magazines to be the best supermini, with What Car? magazine calling it "Car of the Year" in 2003, and their "Supermini of the Year" for three years in a row.

The SEAT Ibiza Mk3 was also used for several purposes, from police cars to rally cars.

The Ibiza Mk3 pre-facelift model was available with the Award, S, SX, Stylance, Reference, Signo, Stella, Sport, FR, and Cupra R trim levels.

The facelifted third generation Ibiza was made from 2006 to 2008. In 2006, slight cosmetic changes were made to both the interior and exterior, but otherwise the model was very similar to the original Mk3. New trim levels were introduced in 2006 as well: Reference, Stylance, Freerider, Sportrider, Sport, DAB Sport (2006 limited edition), Formula Sport (2007 limited edition), FR, and Cupra, as well as engines with increased power (1.2-litre 12v and 1.4-litre 16v) and a new 1.4-litre TDI diesel version. The Ibiza Cupra R TDI and Cupra R 1.8T versions were the top models of the brand, hot hatches designed to compete with rivals in the front-wheel-drive hot hatch segment. There were also two special editions of the Ibiza Cupra R. The first one was called Nürburgring Edition (2006–2007), distinguished by black painted side mirrors and a "Nürburgring" inscription on the door panels. The second was the Last Edition (2008 only) with a new interior logo on the front seats and the gear knob.

Engine specifications

Safety

In 2002, the SEAT Ibiza Mk3 was tested for its safety performance under the Euro NCAP assessment scheme and it achieved a 4-star overall rating:

Awards
 Car of the Year award in 2003, by the British magazine WhatCar?
 Supermini of the Year award three years in a row, by the British magazine WhatCar?

Concept cars
At the 2006 Geneva Motorshow, SEAT presented the SEAT Ibiza Vaillante concept car, which was based on a three-door SEAT Ibiza Mk3.

Fourth generation (6J/6P; 2008) 

The Ibiza Mk4 (Typ 6J) was previewed at the 2008 Geneva Motor Show in the form of the Bocanegra concept car. It was styled by the Belgian car designer Luc Donckerwolke with a distinctive "arrow design", dispensing with the basic Ibiza design language that had been in place since the 1984 original. It was the first among other Volkswagen Group models (Volkswagen Polo Mk5 and Audi A1) to use the latest Volkswagen Group PQ25 platform in the segment of supermini cars,

The model range featured a 5-door hatchback, a 3-door version, and a 5-door estate; the latter was added in Q4 2010.

The new model first went on sale in the summer of 2008, in the 5-door format, followed by a 3-door variant, marketed as the Ibiza SportCoupé or Ibiza SC.

High-performance Ibiza FR, Cupra, and Bocanegra models were launched in June 2009.

In January 2010, SEAT introduced, for the first time in the Volkswagen Group on the Ibiza's specific platform, the 2.0-litre TDI Diesel engine in both a SportCoupe and a five-door Ibiza FR specification.

In September 2010, the Ibiza's SportCoupe and 5-door variants were extended with the addition of the new 1.2-litre TSI  engine.

A special version of the Ibiza Mk4, called "25th anniversary", was presented at the Barcelona Motor Show in 2009, to celebrate the 25th anniversary of the Ibiza.

There were many different trim levels for the Ibiza Mk4. From 2009 onwards, the SEAT Ibiza was used exclusively by the UK-based Young Driver Scheme. The Young Driver Scheme uses a mixture of the SportsCoupe and 5-door variants, powered by the 1.2-litre engine.

In July 2010, a revised Ibiza Ecomotive was announced, powered by a  1.2-litre TDI common rail diesel engine with  emissions of 89 g/km.

Facelift

The facelift model was launched at the 2012 Geneva Motor Show, and sales began shortly thereafter. The facelift consisted of a light exterior and interior refresh.

Ibiza ST
A 5-door estate car variant, the Ibiza ST, was announced in March 2010, at the Geneva Motor Show. 
The preview of the Ibiza ST was shown at the 2009 Frankfurt Motor Show in the form of the IBZ concept car.

Two new engine options were introduced with this model, a 105 PS 1.2-litre TSI (petrol) and a 75 PS 1.2-litre TDI diesel.

Ibiza CONNECT

The CONNECT model was presented at the 2015 Frankfurt Motor Show and was equipped with Full Link connectivity technology and the SEAT ConnectApp. This app allowed the user's smartphone to be connected to the car's infotainment system and to use connectivity features. The SEAT Ibiza CONNECT had a range of exterior body colours that allowed the mirrors and wheels to be customised.

Engine specifications

Note: (*) Also fitted on the Ibiza ST

Safety
In 2008, the SEAT Ibiza Mk4 was tested for its safety performance under the Euro NCAP assessment scheme and it achieved a 5-star overall rating:

In 2011, the SEAT Ibiza Mk4 was tested for its safety performance under the Euro NCAP assessment scheme and it achieved a 5-star overall rating:

Second facelift

The Ibiza received a second, more thorough facelift in 2015. The interior as well as the exterior were changed. According to SEAT, the interior raw materials used were higher in quality, and the overall design was more driver-focused and ergonomic. It was possible to personalise the steering wheel, gear stick, air vents, radio buttons, and door handles with a range of available colours. The centre console was more accessible and there were multiple new technology additions. It was equipped with a multifunctional steering wheel, ambient lighting, and an integrated navigation system along with Full Link technology. The Full Link technology allowed connectivity with the driver's mobile phone in a safe and easy way. Mirror Link technology, through the second-generation MIB infotainment system, also replicated the smartphone screen when a compatible device was plugged in. Full Link was also compatible with both Android and Apple smartphones.

The safety features included were: daytime full-LED lights, parking assist with audio warnings, and a rear-view camera which provides live video from the rear of the car to make the driver aware of obstacles when reversing.

Externally, the biggest difference was full LED lights. It was available as a 5-door, sport coupé, and sport tourer, as with the previous Ibiza. A range of Volkswagen Group's new 1.0-litre three-cylinder engines (MPI and TSI) were also available with the facelifted Ibiza.

Fifth generation (6F/KJ1; 2017)

The fifth-generation SEAT Ibiza 5-door hatchback was introduced at the 2017 Geneva Motor Show. It was based on the MQB A0 platform. It was 2 mm shorter and 87 mm wider than the preceding generation. It was the first vehicle in the VAG group to use the MQB A0 platform, before the VW Polo, Skoda Fabia, and the Audi A1. Engine options included the 1.0-litre MPi, 1.0-litre TSi 3-cylinder petrol, 1.0-litre TSi 3-cylinder CNG, 1.5-litre TSi EVO, and the 1.6-litre TDi four-cylinder diesel.

The new Ibiza shared its styling with its larger sister car in the SEAT range, the León.

Safety
In 2017, the SEAT Ibiza Mk5 was tested for its safety performance under the Euro NCAP assessment scheme and it achieved a 5-star overall rating:

In 2018, the updated Spanish-made Ibiza in its most basic Latin American configuration received 5 stars for adult occupants and 5 stars for toddlers from Latin NCAP.

Facelift 
The facelifted SEAT Ibiza was revealed on April 15, 2021.

Motorsport

The SEAT Ibiza is currently used by German team Münnich Motorsport in the FIA World Rallycross Championship. Debuting at the 2016 World RX of Portugal, the vehicle has had a best result of fifth in the French round of the 2016 season.

Reliability
Reliability has been mixed. Auto Bild endurance tests from 2011 showed the Ibiza had achieved not only the "best result of any car in the VW Group" but also the "best result for a small car in the history of the AutoBild 100,000 km endurance tests". Warranty Direct lists the Ibiza name among the UK's 100 most reliable cars despite recent generations scoring poorly, with SEAT ranked 26th of 40 manufacturers overall.

Sales
Since the first generation of the SEAT Ibiza launched in 1984, more than four million SEAT Ibiza cars had been sold as of 2011.

In the year 2009, the total annual retail sales number of SEAT Ibiza cars was 170,833 vehicles, while the annual production of SEAT Ibiza vehicles made in SEAT's Martorell plant was 173,715 units.

The total production per year of SEAT Ibiza cars, manufactured in SEAT and other Volkswagen group's plants, is shown in the following table:

See also
 Ecomotive

References

External links

 SEAT Ibiza SC – SEAT UK website
 SEAT Ibiza 5dr – SEAT UK website
 SEAT Ibiza ST – SEAT UK website

Cars introduced in 1984
1980s cars
1990s cars
2000s cars
2010s cars
2020s cars
Euro NCAP superminis
Latin NCAP superminis
Front-wheel-drive vehicles
Hatchbacks
Rally cars
Ibiza
Station wagons
Subcompact cars